The 2019 FIBA Basketball World Cup was the 18th tournament of the FIBA Basketball World Cup for men's national basketball teams. The tournament was hosted in China and was rescheduled from 2018 to 2019, becoming the first since 1967 that did not occur in the same year as the FIFA World Cup (which was held the previous year). The tournament expanded from 24 to 32 teams.

The tournament also served as qualification for the 2020 Summer Olympics, which took the top two teams from each of the Americas and Europe, and the top team from each of Africa, Asia and Oceania, alongside the tournament's host Japan. Montenegro and the Czech Republic each made their first appearance as independent nations after previously being part of Serbia and Montenegro and Czechoslovakia respectively, while Poland marked its return to the FIBA Basketball World Cup for the first time since 1967.

The defending champions, the United States, experienced their worst result at a World Cup, losing to France in the quarter-finals and Serbia in the subsequent classification game. The United States' previous worst result was sixth place in 2002. This was the first World Cup at which all three of the historically most successful teams (United States, Serbia/Yugoslavia and Russia/Soviet Union) failed to reach the semi-finals. Asian powerhouse and hosts China, failed to get out of the first round, losing in shocking upsets to Poland and Venezuela. China ultimately missed the Asian qualifying spot for Tokyo, the first time in the country's history they did not qualify directly for the Olympics.

Spain captured their second title after beating Argentina in the final 95–75. It was the second time Spain had reached a World Cup final, and its second win, while for Argentina it would prove to be its second defeat in three attempts. France went on to win the bronze medal for the second consecutive time after defeating Australia 67–59.

Hosts selection

The whole bidding process started in April 2014. Bids from numerous nations were submitted. On 16 March 2015, it was confirmed that the World Cup would be staged in Asia, with China and Philippines as the final countries to be the basis for the selection of the host. On 7 August 2015, it was announced that China won the bid against the Philippines and will host the upcoming World Cup.

Voting results

Venues

Qualification

China as the hosts automatically qualified for the tournament. The continental championships were no longer the qualification system for the World Cup. Instead, two rounds of continental qualifying tournaments were held over two years.

The first round of the Americas, Asia/Oceania and Africa qualifiers featured 16 teams each, whereas Europe had 32 teams. Division A teams were split in groups of four, to be held in a home-and-away round-robin. The top three teams in each groups advanced to round two, and the last placed teams played the best Division B teams to qualify for the next season's Division A.

In round two of the World Cup qualifiers, teams were split in groups of six, totalling four groups in Europe and two in the other qualifiers. Teams carried over the points from round one, and faced other three teams again in a home-and-away round-robin. The best teams in each group qualified for the World Cup.

Starting 2019, no wild card selection was held, and the Olympic champions were not guaranteed a spot in the tournament.

The draw for the qualifiers was held on 7 May 2017 in Guangzhou.

Montenegro and the Czech Republic debuted in the World Cup. Montenegro was formerly a part of Yugoslavia, and later, Serbia and Montenegro teams, while the Czech Republic was a part of the old Czechoslovakia. Poland was returning to the World Cup, after participating in 1967. Canada, China, Germany, Ivory Coast, Russia, and Tunisia were returning to the World Cup after missing out in 2014. Croatia, Egypt, Finland, Mexico, Slovenia, and Ukraine were the teams that participated in 2014 that did not qualify in 2019. Brazil and the United States qualified in 2019, continuing their streaks in participating in all World Cups.

Qualified teams

Africa (5)
 
 
 
 
 

Americas (7)
 
 
 
 
 
  United States
 

Asia and Oceania (8)
 
  (host)
 
 
 
 
 
 

Europe (12)
 
 
 
 
 
 
 
 
 
  Serbia

Squads

Each team had a final roster of 12 players; a team can opt to have one naturalized player as per FIBA eligibility rules from its roster.

Referees
The following referees were selected for the tournament.

 Gentian Cici (ALB)
 Juan Fernández (ARG)
 Leandro Lezcano1 (ARG)
 Leandro Zalazar (ARG)
 Scott Beker (AUS)
 James Boyer (AUS)
 Ademir Zurapović (BIH)
 Guilherme Locatelli (BRA)
 Cristiano Maranho (BRA)
 Martin Horozov (BUL)
 Arnaud Kom Njilo (CMR)
 Matthew Kallio (CAN)
 Michael Weiland (CAN)
 Felipe Ibarra (CHI)

 Duan Zhu (CHN)
 Ye Nan (CHN)
 Yu Jung (TPE)
 Carlos Peralta (ECU)
 Yohan Rosso (FRA)
 Carsten Straube (GER)
 Georgios Poursanidis (GRE)
 Harja Jaladri (INA)
 Ahmed Al-Shuwaili (IRQ)
 Saverio Lanzarini (ITA)
 Manuel Mazzoni (ITA)
 Tolga Şahin (ITA)
 Takaki Kato (JPN)
 Yevgeniy Mikheyev (KAZ)

 Andris Aunkrogers (LVA)
 Mārtiņš Kozlovskis (LVA)
 Omar Bermúdez (MEX)
 Krishna Domínguez (MEX)
 Ahmed Abaakil (MAR)
 Kingsley Ojeaburu (NGA)
 Julio Anaya (PAN)
 Ferdinand Pascual (PHI)
 Wojciech Liszka (POL)
 Michał Proc (POL)
 Alexis Mercado (PUR)
 Jorge Vázquez (PUR)
 Roberto Vázquez (PUR)
 Aleksandar Glišić (SRB)

 Zdenko Tomašovič (SVK)
 Boris Krejič (SVN)
 Luis Castillo (ESP)
 Antonio Conde1 (ESP)
 Hwang In-tae (KOR)
 Kim Jong-kuk (KOR)
 Markos Michaelides (SUI)
 Nicolas Fernandes (TAH)
 Yener Yılmaz (TUR)
 Sergiy Zashchuk (UKR)
 Steve Anderson (USA)
 Matthew Myers (USA)
 Andrés Bartel (URU)
 Daniel García1 (VEN)

1 – Suspended after the match France vs. Lithuania.

Preparation games
Several teams participated in official tournaments or in exhibition ones, either ad hoc or already existing ones, to prepare for the World Cup.

Pan American Games

An official and traditional tournament in the Americas. Out of the eight teams from the tournament, five already qualified to the World Cup. Of these five, all except the United States had players expected to be in the World Cup rosters, with the USA playing with collegiate players. Argentina defeated Puerto Rico to win the gold medal.

Acropolis International Basketball Tournament

An exhibition tournament. All four participating teams used the Acropolis Tournament as a warm-up. Serbia topped the table to win the championship, ahead of Greece.

Austiger Cup

An exhibition tournament. The four teams played in this tournament hosted by China as a warm-up to the World Cup. Serbia topped the table to win the championship, ahead of France.

Málaga Tournament
An exhibition tournament. Four teams participated in a preparation tournament hosted in Málaga, Spain. It was contested by Spain, Democratic Republic of the Congo, Ivory Coast, and the Philippines.

Other games
Exhibition games were held as warm-ups for the World Cup. The United States defeated Spain in the Honda Center in Anaheim, which was between the top two teams in the FIBA World Rankings. Australia's defeat of the United States in Marvel Stadium, Melbourne in the 2019 Australian International Basketball series was the first USA team's loss with NBA players since its 2006 FIBA World Championship semifinals loss to Greece. The USA is the second-youngest team in the tournament and features only two players with international experience. Notably the US is missing over 30 of their best players, who opted out either due to injury, or to prepare for the NBA season.

Format
The tournament was played in three stages. During the first stage, the 32 qualified teams were sorted into eight groups of four (A-H) and each team in a group played the other three teams once. The top two teams from each group then advanced to the second group stage. In the second group stage, there were four groups of four (I-L) made up of the teams that advanced from the first round, with the teams that have not yet played each other facing off against one another once. The top two teams from groups I to L will qualify for the final knockout phase.

Classification rounds were revived after they were not held in 2014. They were traditionally held in every World Championship/World Cup and were last seen in action in 2010.

In total, 92 games were played over a total of 16 days.

Draw
The draw took place on 16 March 2019 at Shenzhen Cultural Center in Shenzhen.

Hosts China and the three best qualified teams as per the February 2019 FIBA World Rankings were seeded in Pot 1, and China and USA were assigned to groups A and E, respectively. Teams in pots 1, 4, 5 and 8 were drawn into Groups A, C, E and G, and Teams in pots 2, 3, 6 and 7 were drawn into Groups B, D, F and H. Canada was moved from Pot 5 to Pot 6, switching places with Iran (the best ranked team from that pot) to avoid having two teams from the Americas in the same group.

FIBA Basketball World Cup 2019 Global Ambassadors Kobe Bryant and Yao Ming, American singer and songwriter Jason Derulo, and Chinese idol singer Yang Chaoyue led the draw ceremony.

After the draw, Group H, which includes Australia, Canada, Lithuania, and Senegal, was described as the "group of death".

Groups A, C, E, and G

Groups B, D, F, and H

Preliminary round

Classification of teams
Highest number of points earned, with each game result having a corresponding point:
Win: 2 points
Loss: 1 point
Loss by default: 1 point, with a final score of 2–0 for the opponents of the defaulting team if the latter team is not trailing or if the score is tied, or the score at the time of stoppage if they are trailing.
Loss by forfeit: 0 points, with a final score of 20–0 for the opponents of the forfeiting team.
Head-to-head record via points system above
Point difference in games among tied teams
Points for in games among tied teams
Point difference in all group games
Points for in all group games
Source: FIBA

Group A

Venue: Wukesong Arena, Beijing

Group B

Venue : Wuhan Gymnasium, Wuhan

Group C

Venue: Guangzhou Gymnasium, Guangzhou

Group D

Venue: Foshan International Sports and Cultural Center, Foshan

Group E

Venue: Shanghai Oriental Sports Center, Shanghai

Group F

Venue: Nanjing Youth Olympic Sports Park Gymnasium, Nanjing

Group G

Venue: Shenzhen Bay Sports Centre, Shenzhen

Group H

Venue: Dongfeng Nissan Cultural and Sports Centre, Dongguan

Second round

Group I

Venue: Foshan International Sports and Cultural Center, Foshan

Group J

Venue: Wuhan Gymnasium, Wuhan

Group K

Venue: Shenzhen Bay Sports Centre, Shenzhen

Group L

Venue: Nanjing Youth Olympic Sports Park Gymnasium, Nanjing

17th–32nd Classification
Bottom 2 teams from each group in Round 1 played in the Classification Round.

Group M

Venue: Guangzhou Gymnasium, Guangzhou

Group N

Venue: Wukesong Arena, Beijing

Group O

Venue: Dongfeng Nissan Cultural and Sports Centre, Dongguan

Group P

Venue: Shanghai Oriental Sports Center, Shanghai

Final round

Quarter-finals

Argentina vs. Serbia

Spain vs. Poland

United States vs. France

Australia vs. Czech Republic

Classification semi-finals

Serbia vs. United States

Poland vs. Czech Republic

Semi-finals

Spain vs. Australia

Argentina vs. France

Seventh place playoff

Fifth place playoff

Third place playoff

Final

Final standings

Awards
The all-star team and MVP were announced on 15 September 2019.

All-Tournament Team

Statistical leaders

Player tournament averages

{| class=" multicol" role="presentation" style="border-collapse: collapse; padding: 0; border: 0; background:transparent; width:100%;"

|style="width: 50.00%;" align="left" valign="top" |

Team tournament averages

Player game highs

Team game highs

Marketing

Logo
The official logo of the 2019 FIBA Basketball World Cup was officially unveiled on 21 March 2017 in a ceremony held in Shanghai. The logo's concept was inspired from the Beijing Opera where the actors symbolize concepts such as wisdom, persistence, power and perfection, which are prerequisite characteristics that the participating players of national team will need to exhibit "in order to succeed". The logo design was also inspired from the Chinese Dragon Dance, a cultural tradition depicting a story of two flying dragons battling over a shining pearl which is meant to parallel the competition of national teams for the Naismith Trophy. The logo was created by Shanghai-based agency Flagship.

Sponsors
Infront China became the exclusive marketing partner for the domestic commercial rights of FIBA Basketball World Cup China 2019, according to a strategic cooperation agreement officially announced between Infront China, a Wanda Sports company, the International Basketball Federation (FIBA) and the Organizing Committee for the competition.

Mascot
An international mascot design competition was organized with the winning mascot chosen by fans. Yan Xu's design, a Chinese Dragon-inspired mascot named Son of Dreams, was announced to be the winning mascot on 18 April 2018. Son of Dreams was born in China on 8 August 2015 one day after China was announced as the host according to the mascot's fictional biography. The magical horns of the mascot is described as having the ability to give the dragon "the power to see in the future, envisioning plays and moves before they actually happen". He wears a red and blue uniform with the tournament's logo and high tops by China's top player Yao Ming. The mascot was chosen over other finalists Speed Tiger who was inspired by a Siberian tiger and QiuQiu (a.k.a. Little Lightning) who was inspired by a Chinese lion. The official mascot made his first public appearance on 28 June 2018 in Shenzhen.

Ball
On 16 March 2019, FIBA revealed the official ball that would be used in the World Cup, Molten BG5000, designed by Molten.

Official song
The song "Champion" was released on 24 July 2019, and performed by American singer-songwriter Jason Derulo featuring Chinese singer Tia Ray. It was performed both in English and the host language Chinese.

Issues and concerns
There were concerns from national federations that they would not be able to play the qualifiers with players from top professional leagues globally (the National Basketball Association and EuroLeague), which was possible with professional leagues operating in mid-year.

Broadcasters
The television rights holders by territory as follows:

Controversy 
Australian center and NBA champion Andrew Bogut voiced concerns on the officiating in the semi-final match against Spain. During the match after a call he disagreed with Bogut was seeing gesturing with his hands that the officials had been bribed. Post match Claiming it was a "disgrace" and encouraging people to look into where the headquarters are based. 3-time NBA champion and Australian assistant coach was less accusative but also cited their run of luck with officiating when the two sides meet.

Patrick Mills was also controversially snubbed from the All-Star five. Even being told he had been in the five before being omitted. Many fans and journalists could not believe he was omitted.

See also

 2018 FIBA Women's Basketball World Cup

References

External links

 
2019
World Cup
2019 in Chinese sport
World Cup, 2019
FIBA Basketball World Cup
FIBA Basketball World Cup